"AinoArika/Aisureba Motto Happy Life" is a single by Hey! Say! JUMP. It was released on February 5, 2014. It debuted in number one on the weekly Oricon Singles Chart and reached number one on the Billboard Japan Hot 100. It was the 28th best-selling single of 2014 in Japan, with 236,027 copies.

Regular Edition
CD
 "AinoArika"
 "Aisureba Motto Happy Life"
 "Oh! My Jelly! (Bokura wa OK)" - Hey! Say! 7
 "Sugiru Setsuna (スギルセツナ)" - Hey! Say! BEST
 "Aino Arika" (Original Karaoke)
 "Aisureba Motto Happy Life" (Original Karaoke)
 "Oh! My Jelly! (Bokura wa OK)" (Original Karaoke) - Hey! Say! 7
 "Sugiru Setsuna (スギルセツナ)" (Original Karaoke) - Hey! Say! BEST

Limited Edition 1
CD
 "AinoArika"
 "Aisureba Motto Happy Life"

DVD
 "AinoArika" (PV & Making of)

Limited Edition 2
CD
 "AinoArika"
 "Aisureba Motto Happy Life"

DVD
 "Aisureba Motto Happy Life" (PV & Making of)

References 

2014 singles
2014 songs
Hey! Say! JUMP songs
Oricon Weekly number-one singles
Billboard Japan Hot 100 number-one singles